The Indrois is a  long river in the Indre and Indre-et-Loire departments in central France. Its source is at Villegouin. It flows generally northwest. It is a right tributary of the Indre, into which it flows at Azay-sur-Indre.

Departments and communes along its course
This list is ordered from source to mouth: 
Indre: Villegouin, Préaux
Indre-et-Loire: Villedômain, Loché-sur-Indrois, Villeloin-Coulangé, Montrésor, Chemillé-sur-Indrois, Beaumont-Village, Genillé, Saint-Quentin-sur-Indrois, Chédigny, Azay-sur-Indre,

References

Rivers of France
Rivers of Centre-Val de Loire
Rivers of Indre
Rivers of Indre-et-Loire